Spain  competed at the 2019 World Aquatics Championships in Gwangju, South Korea from 12 to 28 July 2019.

Medalists

Artistic swimming

Spain's artistic swimming team consisted of 14 athletes (13 female and 1 male).

Women

Mixed

 Legend: (R) = Reserve Athlete

Diving

High diving

Spain qualified one female high diver.

Open water swimming

Spain qualified three male and three female open water swimmers.

Men

Women

Mixed

Swimming 
Men

Spain entered 9 swimmers.

Women

Water polo

Men's tournament

Team roster

Daniel López
Alberto Munarriz
Álvaro Granados
Miguel de Toro Domínguez
Sergi Cabanas
Marc Larumbe
Alberto Barroso
Francisco Fernández
Roger Tahull
Felipe Perrone (C)
Blai Mallarach
Alejandro Bustos
Eduardo Lorrio
Coach: David Martín

Group C

Playoffs

Quarterfinals

Semifinals

Final

Women's tournament

Team roster

Laura Ester
Marta Bach
Anni Espar
Beatriz Ortiz
Roser Tarragó
Irene González
Clara Espar
María del Pilar Peña (C)
Judith Forca
Paula Crespí
Maica García Godoy
Paula Leitón
Elena Sánchez
Coach: Miki Oca

Group C

Quarterfinals

Semifinals

Final

References

World Aquatics Championships
Nations at the 2019 World Aquatics Championships
2019